Benjamin David Birkhead (born 28 October 1998) is an English cricketer. He made his List A debut on 6 May 2019, for Yorkshire in the 2019 Royal London One-Day Cup. He made his Twenty20 debut 20 September 2020, for Yorkshire in the 2020 t20 Blast.

References

External links
 

1998 births
Living people
English cricketers
Yorkshire cricketers
Place of birth missing (living people)
Cricketers from Halifax, West Yorkshire
English cricketers of the 21st century